Syed Murad Ahmed Khairi (31 December 1931 – 2 September 2008) was a career Pakistani diplomat and Foreign Service officer who rose to the rank of Ambassador, with a career as Ambassador to UAE, Brazil, Nigeria and Canada. Syed Murad Ahmed Khairi retired as Pakistan High Commissioner to Canada (1989–1991).

Early life
Syed Murad Ahmed Khairi was born in Monghyr, Bihar in British India (1931) the only son of Advocate Syed Abul Khair who was a lawyer and one of the leaders of the All India Muslim league in Bihar. Syed Murad Khairi was educated at Aligarh Muslim University and Dacca University and was the recipient of gold medals. He completed his B.A. (honors) in Economics and M.A. from Dacca University in 1954 and was selected to join the Foreign Service after competitive examinations in 1954. After joining the Foreign Service, Khairi was trained in France, UK and selected to complete his M.A. in International Affairs at The Fletcher School of Law and Diplomacy, in Boston, MA. He also holds a Master of Science in National Strategy from Quad-i-Azam University.

Career
Khairi’s Diplomatic posts included Burma (1957–59), Syria (1959–61), Brazil (1961–65), Kenya (1965–69), UK (1971–72), USSR(1972–73), Turkey (1974–75), UAE (1975–78), Nigeria and Canada. Khairi served as ambassador in UAE, Nigeria, Brazil and Pakistan High Commissioner in Canada. Khairi was fluent in French, English, Bengali, Portuguese, Urdu and Hindi.

Besides Diplomatic assignments Khairi attended international conferences such as ECOSOC Conference in Alta Gracia in Argentina (1961), UNIDO Conference in Vienna (1970) and CENTO Conference in London (1972).
Khairi led an economic assistance delegation to East and West African countries in 1972. He was deputed as the special envoy of the President and Prime Minister of Pakistan to Egypt, Zimbabwe, Lesotho, Malagasy, Gabon, Cameroon and Equatorial Guinea.

Khairi was selected in 1978–1980 to be on deputation for training of Senior Army officers to the National Defence College (NDC) in Rawalpindi, and had the personal rank of Deputy Commandant of the NDC. This program was initiated by General Zia-ul-Haque, then President of Pakistan for training in Foreign Policy and International Affairs. During his time at the NDC Khairi trained many of Pakistan’s top Army, Navy and Air Force officers including General Ejaz Azim (later Ambassador to USA), Admiral Sirohey who later became Joint Chief of Staff. Khairi led a team of the(NDC)to the People’s Republic of China in April–May 1979 and to Canada, United States and the United Nations in April–May 1980.

Family
Khairi is survived by his wife and three children. Nilofer Khairi is a world-class bridge player and artist and the daughter of Advocate Syed Mohammad Sohail, who was vice mayor of Karachi and politician; Member of National Assembly in Sindh province in Pakistan.  The eldest son Syed Imran Khairi is a graduate GMAP Class of 2004 of the Fletcher School of Law and Diplomacy.

See also
 Central Treaty Organization
 All-India Muslim League

References

External links
 Pakistan high Commissioner to Canada
 ECOSOC
 UNIDO

1931 births
Muhajir people
Ambassadors of Pakistan to Brazil
Ambassadors of Pakistan to the United Arab Emirates
High Commissioners of Pakistan to Canada
High Commissioners of Pakistan to Nigeria
2008 deaths